Maynard Andrew Amerine (1911–1998) was a pioneering researcher in the cultivation, fermentation, and sensory evaluation of wine. His academic work at the University of California at Davis is recognized internationally.  His 16 books and some 400 articles contributed significantly to the development of the modern (post-Prohibition) wine industry in California; to the improvement of wine cultures in Europe, South America, and Australia; and to the professional standards for judging and tasting wine.

In the early 1940s, he and his colleague Albert J. Winkler developed the Winkler scale, a technique for classifying wine growing regions based on temperatures, that continues to be used in the United States and elsewhere. His research, organizational, and advisory efforts in wine tasting helped bring about a more objective vocabulary to that field, based on flavors and scents rather than allusive references.

Biography
Amerine was born in 1911 in San Jose, California, the child of Roy Reagan Amerine and Tennessee Davis Amerine.  He grew up on their farm in Modesto, California.  In 1935, while still completing his PhD in plant physiology at the University of California at Berkeley, he became the first faculty member hired into the new Viticulture and Enology Department at the University of California at Davis.  He became full professor in 1952, was deemed All-University Lecturer in 1962, and continued his research and teaching at Davis until his retirement in 1974.  He remained Professor Emeritus, served as an advisor at the Wine Institute in San Francisco, and continued to write, travel, and advise on wine production and evaluation nearly until his death in 1998.

Amerine was featured on an episode of "To Tell the Truth" on the CBS television network in the 1960s accompanied by two impostors. Host Bud Collyer read a description of Amerine's work at UC Davis noting that his tasting class was "closed to undergraduates." Amerine sat in the middle seat (No. 2). The panel for the show: Tom Poston, Kitty Carlisle, Don Ameche, Polly Bergen. (Bergen asked No. 3: "Where is the University of California, besides being in California?" No. 3 answered that the branch where he taught was in Davis, CA; Bergen seemed extremely dubious about this answer [i.e., not familiar with the fact that UC has a Davis campus, perhaps expecting "Berkeley" or "Los Angeles"].) None of the panelists chose the real Amerine; three votes went to No. 1 and one to No. 3.

The first named professorship at the University of California was endowed in Amerine's honor, as the Maynard Amerine Chair, by Ernest Gallo (an early classmate of Amerine's).  In 1991, the Maynard A. Amerine Room and Wine Collection in Shields Library was named in his honor and to house his extensive collection of books, a product of his years as a wine bibliographer and collector.

His wine of choice was California zinfandel, according to his New York Times obituary (see link below).

Selected publications
 1965. Wine, An Introduction. Revised edition 1975 with Vernon L. Singleton.
 1976. Wines: Their Sensory Evaluation, with Edward B. Roessler (W.H. Freeman & Company). Revised and enlarged, 1983.
 Table Wines and Dessert and Appetizer Wines, with Maynard A. Joslyn.
 Technology of Winemaking, with William V. Cruess, Harold W. Berg; revised with Ralph E. Kunkee, Cornelius S. Ough, Vernon L. Singleton, and A. Dinsmore Webb.

References

 "Maynard A. Amerine, Viticulture and Enology: Davis," in University of California: In Memoriam, 1998, editid by David Krogh (Oakland, CA: Academic Senate, University of California, 1998).
  Obituary: "Maynard Amerine, 87, California Wine Expert," New York Times, 13 March 1998.

External links 
Maynard Amerine Papers at Archives and Special Collections at Shields Library, University of California, Davis
 Video of class taught by Amerine: Viticulture and Enology 125: Sensory Analysis of Wine, from the UCD Library Special Collections
 Biography of Amerine, from the UCD Library

1911 births
1998 deaths
People from San Jose, California
Oenologists
University of California, Davis faculty
UC Berkeley College of Natural Resources alumni
Scientists from California
20th-century American scientists
People from Modesto, California